Tim Hornke (born 4 August 1990) is a German handball player who plays for SC Magdeburg and the German national team.

References

1990 births
Living people
Sportspeople from Hanover
German male handball players
SC Magdeburg players
21st-century German people